The Hay Shire is a local government area in the Riverina area of south-western New South Wales, Australia. The Shire comprises  and is located adjacent to the Sturt, Mid-western and Cobb Highways. The area includes the towns of Hay, Booligal and Maude.

Hay Shire was established in 1965 by the amalgamation of the Municipality of Hay with the surrounding Waradgery Shire.

The mayor of Hay Shire is Cr. Bill Sheaffe, an unaligned politician.

Demographics

Council

Current composition and election method
Hay Shire Council is composed of eight councillors elected proportionally as a single ward. All councillors are elected for a fixed four-year term of office. The mayor is elected by the councillors at the first meeting of the council. The most recent election was held on 10 September 2016, and the makeup of the council is as follows:

The current Council, elected in 2016, in order of election, is:

Literary reference
Banjo Paterson (1864–1941) wrote a poem called Hay and Hell and Booligal about the district.

References

 
Local government areas of the Riverina
Local government areas of New South Wales
1965 establishments in Australia